Tim Esmay is an American baseball coach.  He is the former head coach of the Arizona State Sun Devils baseball team.  He was the head coach of the Arizona State Sun Devils baseball team from prior to the 2010 season until the end of the 2014 season, when he announced his resignation.  Esmay is an Arizona State alumnus, and he played baseball there from 1986–1987.  After graduating from Arizona State in 1987, Esmay served as an assistant at Arizona State, Grand Canyon, and Utah.  He was Utah's head coach from 1997–2004, before he was hired as an assistant at Arizona State prior to the 2005 season.

From 2005–2009, Esmay served as an assistant under Pat Murphy.  Following the 2009 season, Murphy was forced to resign due to violations of NCAA rules regarding student-athlete employment and recruiting.  Esmay was hired as an interim head coach for the 2010 season. After leading the Sun Devils to the 2010 College World Series, Arizona State removed the "interim" tag from his title and formally named him the fourth head coach of the varsity era.  As a result of Murphy's violations, the NCAA imposed sanctions on the program, including a ban from the postseason in 2012.

Head coaching record

References

Arizona State Sun Devils baseball coaches
Arizona State Sun Devils baseball players
Grand Canyon Antelopes baseball coaches
Scottsdale Fighting Artichokes baseball players
Living people
Minor league baseball managers
Utah Utes baseball coaches
Year of birth missing (living people)